Mbouda is the capital of the Bamboutos department of West Province, Cameroon.  Projected to be the fourteenth fastest growing city on the African continent between 2020 and 2025, with a 5.16% growth.

Notable people born in Mbouda 
  (Gilbert Nguita Noumessi), author / composer.
 , politician.
 , bishop, born in Balatchi in 1946.
 Jacques Toussele, photographer, born in Bamessingué
 Christophe Fofié (1946-1999), politician, businessman  and sports promoter.
 Etienne Poufwon, politician. Also known as Poufong Etienne
 Martin Kuete, also known as Mylord, politician, born in Babete.

Buildings 
In 2022, American YouTuber MrBeast built a well in the city.

Sport 
Mbouda has a municipal stadium, renovated from 2007 to 2009, then a second time between 2018 and 2020 to be a training stadium for the Africa Cup of Nations 2021. It is the home of Bamboutos FC.

References 

Populated places in West Region (Cameroon)